The second round of CAF matches for 2022 FIFA World Cup qualification was played over six matchdays, from 1 September to 16 November 2021.

Format
The second round saw the top 26 ranked CAF teams joined by the 14 winners from the first round. These teams were drawn into ten groups of four teams to play home-and-away round-robin matches. The winners of each group advanced to the third round.

Seeding
The draw for the second round was held on 21 January 2020, 19:00 CAT (UTC+2), at the Nile Ritz-Carlton in Cairo, Egypt.

The seeding was based on the FIFA World Rankings of December 2019 (shown in parentheses below).

Note: Bolded teams qualified for the third round.

† First round winners

Schedule
Below is the schedule of the second round of CAF 2022 FIFA World Cup qualification. After the rescheduling of the 2021 Africa Cup of Nations final tournament from June/July to January/February, the dates of Matchdays 1 and 2 of the second round were rescheduled. Because the competition was interrupted by the COVID-19 pandemic, the schedule of the second round was revised again and on 19 August 2020 CAF announced the new dates, and the entire second round was postponed to 2021. On 6 May 2021, the second round was once again postponed due to the pandemic, and all matches were rescheduled to be played between September and November 2021.

Groups

Group A

Group B

Group C

Group D

Group E

Group F

Group G

Group H

Group I

Group J

Goalscorers

Notes

References

External links

Qualifiers – Africa Matches: Round 2, FIFA.com

2
Qual
FIFA World Cup qualification, CAF Round 2
FIFA World Cup qualification, CAF Round 2
FIFA World Cup qualification, CAF Round 2
Cameroon at the 2022 FIFA World Cup
Ghana at the 2022 FIFA World Cup
Morocco at the 2022 FIFA World Cup
Senegal at the 2022 FIFA World Cup
Tunisia at the 2022 FIFA World Cup